Clipped is an American sitcom that aired on TBS from June 16 to August 18, 2015. The series stars Mike Castle and Ashley Tisdale and centers on a group of co-workers who all went to high school together but ran in very different crowds. Now they find themselves working together at Buzzy's, a barbershop. On October 23, 2015, TBS canceled the series after one season.

Premise

Clipped takes place in a Charlestown, Massachusetts barbershop called Buzzy's, named after the original owner (George Wendt) who still works there. The shop's new owner is Ben (Ryan Pinkston), an unpopular student during high school who now finds himself in charge of some formerly more popular classmates. These include AJ (Mike Castle) and Danni (Ashley Tisdale), who once dated each other and who are both chasing bigger dreams. AJ was a star pitcher on the school's baseball team and still hopes to play professionally, while Danni is an aspiring singer. The rest of the staff consists of Ben's best friend Mo (Matt Cook), sarcastic stylist Charmaine (Diona Reasonover), and perpetually cheerful receptionist Joy (Lauren Lapkus).

Cast
 Mike Castle as A.J. Salerno
 Ashley Tisdale as Danni Giordano
 Lauren Lapkus as Joy
 Ryan Pinkston as Benjamin Herschel "Ben" Grossman
 Matt Cook as Mo McCracken 
 Diona Reasonover as Charmaine Eskowitz
 George Wendt as Buzzy

Recurring
 Crista Flanagan as Rhonda Doyle
Dana Powell as Robin Doyle
Lisa Schurga as Rosalee Doyle
 Betsy Sodaro as Rita Doyle
C.J. Vana as Lonnie, Ben's cousin
 Skyler Stone as Travis, a sex-crazed man who owns the tattoo parlor next door; he makes advances on Danni, Joy and Charmaine
 Reginald VelJohnson as Tommy, Buzzy's partner and later husband

Development
In May 2013, Turner Broadcasting held its annual upfront presentation. Turner Broadcasting announced it was developing a series on TBS with the working title of Clipsters. With David Kohan and Max Mutchnick as writers and executive producers, the series would be an ensemble workplace comedy that involved an eclectic cast of hair stylists at barbershop in Worcester, Massachusetts.

In April 2014, Turner Broadcasting announced that George Wendt, Ashley Tisdale, and Lauren Lapkus would star in the series. The series was now considered untitled. The series' premise involved a group of former high school students who came from different circles, and now work together at Buzzy’s Barbershop in their hometown of Charlestown, Massachusetts. They all long for moving to Boston, but they are making the best of their lives in Charlestown.

On May 6, 2014, TBS, ahead of its upfront presentation in New York, picked up three comedies to series. TBS announced it had greenlit ten episodes. The series was then named Buzzy's.

The series, titled Clipped, premiered on June 16, 2015.

It aired for one season.

Episodes

Critical reception
The review aggregator website Rotten Tomatoes reported a 43% approval rating, with a rating average of 6/10, based on 7 reviews. On Metacritic, which assigns a normalized rating, the series has a score of 55 out of 100, based on 5 critics, indicating "mixed or average reviews".

In a positive review, Diane Werts of Newsday awarded the pilot a grade of a B+ and stated, "There's also a lot of craft behind "Clipped." That finally tips the scales in the Turner cable world, where TNT has found success with slick dramas like "Rizzoli & Isles" and "Major Crimes," while comedy sibling TBS more often seems to whiff. Not this time". Similarly, Whitney Matheson of The Hollywood Reporter commended the cast's chemistry: "Clipped’s charm lies in distinctive performances by Lapkus and Cook. Just as Wendt and Tisdale will attract their own admirers, so will these two comedians, whether it’s for Lapkus’ Orange Is the New Black role or the actors' respective podcasts". Conversely, Matthew Gilbert of The Boston Globe criticized the show as "forgettable — if not unpleasant", citing that the elements of "Clipped" might have "resonated and felt fresher" if Will & Grace hadn’t preceded it.

References

External links
 
 

2010s American sitcoms
2015 American television series debuts
2015 American television series endings
English-language television shows
TBS (American TV channel) original programming
Television shows set in Boston
Television series by Warner Horizon Television